Oleg Dulub or Aleh Dulub (born 20 September 1965) is a Belarusian professional football coach and a former player.

Career
From 7 October 2016 until 11 June 2017, he worked as a manager at Karpaty Lviv.

References

External links
 
 Oleg Dulub at Footballdatabase

1961 births
Living people
Soviet footballers
Belarusian footballers
Association football midfielders
Belarusian expatriate footballers
Expatriate footballers in Russia
Expatriate footballers in the Czech Republic
Expatriate footballers in Latvia
Expatriate footballers in Finland
Expatriate footballers in China
Belarusian expatriate sportspeople in Russia
Belarusian expatriate sportspeople in the Czech Republic
Belarusian expatriate sportspeople in Latvia
Belarusian expatriate sportspeople in Finland
Belarusian expatriate sportspeople in China
Belarusian expatriate sportspeople in Ukraine
FC Fandok Bobruisk players
FC Vitebsk players
FC Gomel players
FC Shakhtyor Soligorsk players
FC Molodechno players
FC Yugra Nizhnevartovsk players
1. FC Slovácko players
SK Blāzma players
Dinaburg FC players
Kokkolan Palloveikot players
FC Livadiya Dzerzhinsk players
TP-47 players
FC Viktoryja Marjina Horka players
Belarusian football managers
Belarusian expatriate football managers
Expatriate football managers in Ukraine
Expatriate football managers in Kazakhstan
Ukrainian Premier League managers
FC Krumkachy Minsk managers
FC Karpaty Lviv managers
FC Chornomorets Odesa managers
FC BATE Borisov managers
FC Atyrau managers
FC Lviv managers